John Hall (born 1902) was an English footballer who played as a wing half for Rochdale.

References

Rochdale A.F.C. players
Great Harwood F.C. players
Rossendale United F.C. players
Bacup Borough F.C. players
English footballers
Association football wingers
People from Heywood, Greater Manchester
1902 births
Year of death missing